Claudio Fattoretto (May 12, 1956 – June 30, 2013) was an Italian voice actor.

Biography
Born in Rome, Fattoretto was known for dubbing voices. He was renowned for voicing Dr. Zoidberg in the Italian-Language version of Futurama as well as Lieutenant Commander Worf in the Italian-Language version of Star Trek: The Next Generation and Sideswipe in the Italian-Language version of the Transformers live-action franchise.

Fattoretto was also known for dubbing Ving Rhames and Terry Crews in a few of their films. He also dubbed Dolph Lundgren, Samuel L. Jackson, Danny Trejo, Ron Perlman, Luis Guzmán and Michael Madsen in a select number of their movies.

Death
Fattoretto died after a stroke on June 30, 2013 at the age of 57. Angelo Nicotra took over as the voice of Zoidberg in the remaining episodes of Futurama as well as Simpsorama (The special crossover episode of The Simpsons).

Dubbing roles

Animation
Scarface in The Animals of Farthing Wood
Dr. John A. Zoidberg in Futurama (season 1-7x06)
Dr. John A. Zoidberg in Futurama: Bender's Big Score
Dr. John A. Zoidberg in Futurama: The Beast With a Billion Backs
Dr. John A. Zoidberg in Futurama: Bender's Game
Dr. John A. Zoidberg in Futurama: Into the Wild Green Yonder
Vincent in Over the Hedge
Commander Vachir in Kung Fu Panda
Knuckles in The Swan Princess: Escape from Castle Mountain
Roberto in Open Season 2
Roberto in Open Season 3
Luca in Garfield: The Movie
Bobo the Bear in The Muppets
Heihachi Mishima in Tekken: The Motion Picture

Live action
Worf in Star Trek: The Next Generation
Worf in Star Trek Generations
Worf in Star Trek: First Contact
Worf in Star Trek: Insurrection
Worf in Star Trek: Nemesis
Sideswipe in Transformers: Revenge of the Fallen
Sideswipe in Transformers: Dark of the Moon
Aaron Thibadeaux in Entrapment
Kenneth Hall in Dawn of the Dead
Fred G. Duncan in I Now Pronounce You Chuck & Larry
Hellboy in Hellboy
Hellboy in Hellboy II: The Golden Army
Isador "Machete" Cortez in Machete
Shaq in Scary Movie 4
Bill Broussard in JFK
Jad in Minority Report
Teal'c in Stargate SG-1

Video games
Dr. John A. Zoidberg in Futurama

References

External links

1956 births
2013 deaths
Male actors from Rome
Italian male voice actors
20th-century Italian male actors
21st-century Italian male actors